There are two biblical characters named Abihud.
 One of the sons of Bela, the son of Benjamin; called also Ahihud (1 Chronicles 8:3,7).
 A  son or grandson of Zerubbabel, and member of the Davidic line. Abihud was the father of Eliakim (Matthew 1:13, "Abiud"), and possibly the same as Obadiah (1 Chronicles 3:21).

The name may also occasionally be romanized as Abioud (Greek) or 'Abiyhuwd (Hebrew).

Meaning
The name "Abihud" means "the (divine) father is glory", according to Cheyne and Black (1899). The name "Ehud" is probably a shorter form of "Abihud."

Descendants
In the genealogy of Jesus, Abihud's male-line descendants are depicted:
Generation 1: Eliakim
Generation 2: Azor
Generation 3: Zadok
Generation 4: Achim
Generation 5: Eliud
Generation 6: Eleazar
Generation 7: Matthan
Generation 8: Jacob
Generation 9: Joseph
Generation 10: Jesus

References

 

Set index articles on Hebrew Bible people
Davidic line
Jewish royalty